Terrence John McCann (March 23, 1934 – June 7, 2006), commonly known as Terry McCann, was an American wrestler who won the Gold Medal in the bantamweight division of freestyle wrestling at the 1960 Summer Olympics in Rome, and later helped found the United States Wrestling Federation (now called USA Wrestling). He was born in Chicago, Illinois.

He was also the retired executive director of Toastmasters International, having served in that position for 26 years.

He died in Dana Point, California, at age 72 from mesothelioma, a rare asbestos-linked cancer of the pleura.

Wrestling

McCann began wrestling in a city-sponsored park recreation program when he was 11.  McCann wrestled collegiately for the Iowa Hawkeyes where he only lost three matches in three years while winning three Big Ten and two NCAA titles.  He then went on to represent the United States in the 1960 Summer Olympics where he won a gold medal.  McCann was inducted, as a Distinguished Member, into the National Wrestling Hall of Fame and Museum (USA) in 1977.

Toastmasters International

McCann was appointed as the executive director of Toastmasters International (TI) in March 1975, having accepted the position in February.  He was TI's fourth and longest serving Executive Director.

A decade earlier he had already discovered the benefits of the TI program, when he joined the Oil Capital Toastmasters club in Tulsa, Oklahoma, upon the suggestion of Bill Borders, a friend and former national wrestling champion.

Hobbies

McCann enjoyed physical sports such as bicycling, surfing and weightlifting, despite having endured nine knee operations and a shoulder operation.

Litigation

In August 2005, McCann sued a large number of companies in the Superior Court of Los Angeles County on a variety of product liability theories.  Among the defendants he named were Georgia-Pacific, Viacom, Crane Co., Philips, Sunoco, Crown Cork and Seal, Owens-Illinois, John Crane Inc., and Ingersoll Rand.

McCann sued one company, Foster Wheeler, because it had manufactured a boiler installed at an Oklahoma oil refinery where he had been present in 1957 for a couple of weeks while working as an engineering sales trainee for the general contractor building the refinery.  Although Foster Wheeler has deep ties to the asbestos industry, particularly in regards to steam condensers, pumps, heat exchangers, and boiler components manufactured for the U.S. Navy, it was undisputed that this particular boiler did not come with any insulation. However, McCann's lawyers argued that Foster Wheeler should be held liable anyway for the refinery's decision to put asbestos-containing insulation on the boiler:

Foster Wheeler obtained summary judgment against McCann by arguing that California's "borrowing statute," Code of Civil Procedure Section 361, required the superior court to apply Oklahoma's 10-year statute of repose for improvements to real property.  While a statute of limitations runs from discovery of an injury, a statute of repose runs from completion of the injury-causing product or building; therefore, under Oklahoma's statute, McCann's right to sue Foster Wheeler terminated in 1968 (even though he did not get sick until many years later).

On February 18, 2010, the Supreme Court of California unanimously ruled, after a lengthy conflict of laws analysis, that California can apply another state's statute of repose against a California resident, like McCann, where all the defendant's tortious conduct occurred only in the other state. In an opinion signed by Chief Justice Ronald M. George, the Court held:

The Court remanded to the Court of Appeal to allow McCann's estate to further litigate its other remaining attack against Foster Wheeler: whether the boiler was actually an improvement to real property within the meaning of the Oklahoma statute of repose.  Obviously, if the boiler was not such an improvement, the statute of repose would not apply to cut off McCann's claims.  The Court of Appeal eventually did rule for Foster Wheeler and against McCann on that issue, in an unpublished decision released on November 30, 2010.  McCann's estate petitioned for review of that decision.  The state supreme court denied review on February 16, 2011, thus bringing McCann's lawsuit to an end after over five years of litigation.

Notes

External links
 Obituary (not available as of 17 July 2006)
  USA The Olympian Obituary - starts p21

Wrestlers at the 1960 Summer Olympics
American male sport wrestlers
Deaths from cancer in California
1934 births
2006 deaths
Medalists at the 1960 Summer Olympics
Olympic gold medalists for the United States in wrestling